The Saiga Conservation Alliance SCA is a network of researchers and conservationists working to study and protect the critically endangered Saiga Antelope (Saiga tatarica) and their habitat. The Saiga are often seen a major flagship species of the Central Asian and pre-Caspian steppes. In the last ten years, saiga populations have declined by 96%, which is the fastest decline ever recorded for a mammal species.
Saiga Conservation Alliance is partnered with the Wildlife Conservation Network

History
In September 2006, the organization was formally founded.

In June 2015, E.J. Milner-Gulland said, 'Anti-poaching needs to be a top priority for the Russian and Kazakh governments.'

Programs

CMS Project Monitoring
SCA was contracted by the United Nations Environment Programme's (UNEP) Convention on the Conservation of Migratory Species (CMS)to monitor progress of saiga conservation. Part of this projects involves maintaining a database of saiga experts and conservationist as well as compiling data and disseminating it world-wide.

Russia
The Russian branch of SCA is the Centre for Wild Animals in Kalmykia. They are the world's only successful captive breeding program for saigas. Other programs include working with local villages and poor households which agree to help conserve saigas.

Kazakhstan
The Kazakhstan branch of SCA Monitors saiga populations to determine conservation efficacy. Surveys with locals monitors poaching activities and the reasons behind them.

Uzbekistan
The Uzbekistan branch conducts research into what the problems are of saiga conservation and negotiates plans for action between the government and local people.

Bulletin
A report about saiga conservation and news is published in six languages twice-yearly.

Small Grants Program
Annual small grants competition to help build grassroots saiga conservation projects.

Education
Every year SCA conservationists attend the Wildlife Conservation Network Expo to meet other conservationists and share methodology. They also hold presentations to educate and update the public and supporters.

See also

 Wildlife Conservation Network
 Conservation movement
 Environmental movement
 Natural environment
 Sustainability

References

External links

 saiga-conservation.com/ Saiga Conservation Alliance Website
 wildnet.org, Wildlife Conservation Network Website

Organizations established in 1996
International environmental organizations
Endangered species
Wildlife conservation organizations
Conservation projects